The 2011 Wichita mayoral election took place on April 5, 2011, to elect the Mayor of Wichita, Kansas. The election was held concurrently with various other local elections, and was officially nonpartisan. It saw the reelection of incumbent mayor Carl Brewer.

Results

Primary

General election

References

2011
2011 Kansas elections
2011 United States mayoral elections